Dimitrios Tsionanis (born 31 August 1961) is a German / Greek former footballer.

References

External links

1961 births
Living people
German footballers
Greek footballers
SV Waldhof Mannheim players
2. Bundesliga players
Bundesliga players
Association football defenders
Greece international footballers
People from Serres (regional unit)
Footballers from Central Macedonia